Crashing Through Danger is a 1938 American romantic comedy/drama film directed by Sam Newfield.

Plot
Three electrical linemen work through the hazardous conditions of the Great Depression era. Tension ensues when Ann Foster comes between them, and they move in together following the accidental death of her father, who was also their supervisor.

Cast 
Ray Walker as Torchy
Sally Blane as Ann Foster
Guinn "Big Boy" Williams as Slim
James Bush as Eddie
Guy Usher Superintendent Carter
Robert Homans as Pop Foster
Syd Saylor as Tom
Dick Curtis as Foreman

Stanley Fields appears uncredited.

References

External links 

1938 films
1938 comedy-drama films
1930s English-language films
American black-and-white films
American comedy-drama films
Films directed by Sam Newfield
1930s American films
English-language comedy-drama films